Thomas William Gordon (born 1957) is the current dean of Leighlin.

He was born in Portadown, educated at the University of Ulster and ordained deacon in 1989 and priest in 1980. He began his ecclesiastical career as a minor canon  at St Anne's Cathedral, Belfast. He was the priest vicar at Christ Church Cathedral, Dublin from 1996 to 2010, when he moved to Old Leighlin.

In 2011, Gordon became the first cleric of the Church of Ireland to enter into a same-sex civil partnership, and this was welcomed by his community.

References

1957 births
Living people
Alumni of Ulster University
Irish Anglicans
Deans of Leighlin